Fet3p is a multicopper oxidase (MCO)2 found in Saccharomyces cerevisiae with a structure consisting of three cupredoxin-like β-barrel domains and four copper ions located in three distinct metal sites (T1 in domain 3, T2, and the binuclear T3 at the interface between domains 1 and 3). Fet3p is a type I membrane protein with an orientation that places the amino-terminal oxidase domain in the exocellular space (Nexo) and the carboxyl terminus in the cytoplasm (Ccyt).

Part of the ferroxidase reaction, Fet3p catalyzes the oxidation of Fe(II) to Fe(III) using O2 as substrate. The Fe(III) generated by Fet3p is a ligand for the iron permease, Ftr1p.

References

Oxidoreductases